Tell Saatiya is an archaeological site 4.4 km south southwest of Majdal Anjar on the road to Rachaya in the Beqaa Mohafazat (Governorate) in Lebanon. It dates at least to the Neolithic with large quantities of Early Bronze Age materials.

References

Baalbek District
Neolithic settlements
Bronze Age sites in Lebanon